Faucalized voice, also called hollow voice or yawny voice, is a vocal quality of speech production characterized by the vertical expansion of the pharyngeal cavity due to the lowering of the larynx.  It is termed faucalized because of the stretching of the fauces and visible narrowing of the faucial pillars in the back of the oral cavity.  During faucalized voice, the sides of pharynx expand outward and the larynx descends and tilts forward.  The term "yawny voice" is appropriate to compare this voice quality to the physiological act of yawning.  Its opposite is harsh voice, a vocal quality produced when the pharynx is contracted and the larynx raised.  Faucalized voice is not to be confused with breathy voice, which involves relaxed vocal folds, greater velocity of airflow through the glottis and produces a lower pitch sound.  Faucalized voice involves the forward tilting of the larynx which stretches the vocal folds and produces a higher pitch sound, despite the increased volume of the pharyngeal cavity.

There is no symbol for faucalized voice in the standard IPA. Diacritics seen in the literature include the linguolabial diacritic or the strong articulation diacritic of the Extensions to the IPA. In the VoQS, the voice-quality symbol for faucalized voice is Vꟸ, though this is normally only placed on a capital vee for "voice".  The asterisk, IPA for articulations that do not have existing symbols, could also be used: .

Nilotic languages

It is widely accepted that the Bor dialect of the Dinka language (also called Moinyjieng) has two distinct voice qualities: modal voice and breathy voice. The existence of two additional voice qualities, faucalized (or hollow) voice and harsh (or tense) voice, is claimed by linguist Keith Denning among others.

Faucalized voice and harsh voice denote a contrast between the verbal categories venitive (movement toward the speaker) and itive (movement away from the speaker). Voice quality is also contrastive between singular and plural nouns in Dinka and other Nilotic languages (Nuer and Shilluk), but this relationship is less regular. In the following tables, modal ("hard") vowels contrast with faucalized ("breathy"). Notice that faucalization corresponds with the ventive case and with plural nouns.

References

Phonation